The BENE-League Handball 2020-21 was the sixth edition of the multi-national handball competition between Belgium and the Netherlands.

Achilles Bocholt were defending champions.

After the early ending of the BENE-League competition due to the COVID-19 pandemic, has the Dutch team of Handbal Houten has withdrawn from the BENE-League season 2020/2021. This has made a ticket available for the Dutch team. The top 3 of the Dutch Eredivisie (Wematrans/Quintus, Oosting/E&O and Anytime Fitness/BFC) have been asked to be promoted to the BENE-League. All three club refused this. The committee of the BENE-League have decide the competition play what 11 teams.

Clubs

Rangking

Final Four

Semifinals

Match for third place

Final

References

External links 
 Official website

BENE-League Handball
2020–21 domestic handball leagues
BENE-League
2020-21 BENE-League